Rhizobium mongolense is a Gram negative root nodule bacteria, which nodulates and forms nitrogen-fixing symbioses with Medicago ruthenica. Its type strain is USDA 1844.

References

Further reading

External links

LPSN
Type strain of Rhizobium mongolense at BacDive -  the Bacterial Diversity Metadatabase

Rhizobiaceae
Bacteria described in 1998